Circumferential Road 4 may refer to:

 Epifanio De los Santos Avenue
 C-4 Road